Events in the year 2020 in East Timor.

Incumbents

Events 
Ongoing — COVID-19 pandemic in East Timor

 21 March – The first case of COVID-19 is confirmed in East Timor, a state of emergency is declared. 
 6 April – The first COVID-19 linked death is reported, a 44-year-old woman.
 30 November – The state of emergency ends, the requirement to wear face masks outdoors is lifted.

Sports 

 The 2020 Liga Futebol Amadora Terceira Divisão was cancelled due to the COVID-19 pandemic.
 13 November – 12 December: 2020 Taça 12 de Novembro.

References 

 

 
2020s in East Timor
Years of the 21st century in East Timor
East Timor
East Timor